Mamta is a 1952 Bollywood film directed by Dada Gunjal. It was produced by J. L. Sharma and R. D. Haldia. L. C. Kapoor was the cinematographer of  the film. The story of the film was written by Chaturbhuj Doshi, while the dialogues were written by Kabil Amrutsari. It stars Sumitra Devi as the protagonist.

Most of the songs of the film were composed by Sonik, with lyrics penned by Shyam Hindi, Verma Malik, Shevan Rizvi and Moti B. A. The film created ripples in media due to its theme of single motherhood and failed to impress at the box office.

Cast
Sumitra Devi
Ulhas
Mirza Musharraf
Rajan Haksar
Kamal Mehra
Chitralekha
Bhagwandas
Rajni
Shantabai
Sadiq
Kaabil Amrutsari
Baby Salma
Master Raja
G. P. Srivastava
Paro Devi
Ramesh
Sheila

Crew

Soundtrack

Reception
 The film was critically applauded. Sumitra Devi was critically appreciated for her role. Filmzack wrote, "She manipulated all her magnificent characteristics to vivify her role; her calmness, her softness, pain and pang and all were infused into one." The film failed to achieve favour at the box office.

References

External links

1952 films
1950s Hindi-language films
Indian black-and-white films